Brother and sister who became the sun and moon is a traditional Korean tale that explains the origins of the sun and moon. It is also called The reason sorghum is red. This fairy tale was featured in the Korean post stamp.

Plot 

A tiger catches and eats an old mother who went to work at a rich neighbor's house. Then the tiger disguises itself in the mother's clothes and a head scarf, goes to the house where the brother and sister live, and tells them to open the door. The brother and sister look out through the hole in the door and think it's a tiger, so they escape through the back door and climb up onto a tree. When the tiger chased it, climbed up the tree, the tiger applied sesame oil on the rope and tried to climb it. The brother and sister prayed to the sky and climbed up on the iron rope sent down from the sky, then became the sun and the moon. The tiger follows the brother and sister and ascends to the sky on a rotten rope, but the rope breaks and it falls onto a sorghum stalk to his death. God made the older brother the sun and the younger sister the moon, but the younger sister said that she was afraid of the night, so they switched roles so that the older brother became the moon and the younger sister the sun. The sister emits a powerful light as she is shy to be stared at by people during the day.

Analysis 

Folktales in the form of sun-sister, moon-brother or sun-brother, moon-sister are widely distributed all over the world, and are also called sun-moon origin myths because they explain the origins of the sun and moon. In Korea, it has been widely transmitted orally under titles such as Brother and sister who became the sun and moon or The Sun and the Moon. The earliest recorded and reported material is the contents presented above, which is The Sun and the Moon (written by Zong In Sob), narrated by O Su-hwa in South Gyeongsang Province in 1911. Since it was published in an English book introducing Korean folktales under the title of The Sun and the Moon, only the plot is organized, but the basic motifs of this type of folktale are well equipped. The killing of the mother by the tiger, the confrontation between the tiger and the siblings, the ascension of the brother and sister, the punishment of the tiger, and the exchange of the sun and the moon between the brother and sister. Basically, it is a folktale in the form of an animal story in which a tiger appears, but it is not entirely an animal story. In order to understand this story, it is necessary to look at both the mythological context and the folktale context.

Characteristics  

The relationship between chasing and being chased is the driving force of this story, and the chasing being is not necessarily an animal, but it is also common that it is a human being. In Manchu and Inuit mythology, the brother chases the sister. In the Nanai tribe, a man pursues a woman, and in Japan, a stepmother is a pursuer. In another Manchu mythology, in the relationship between sisters-in-law, one abuses the other to death. When a person, not an animal, is the main character, the conflict within the family appears as a chasing and being pursued relationship. Therefore, it is appropriate to understand the case of brother and sister as a problem within family relationships.

The most sensitive issue in brother-sister relationships is the taboo on incest. The brother-sister marriage motif also appears in the flood myth, and the prohibition of incest is presented as a problem. Brother and Sister Who Became the Sun and Moon is also in this context. In Inuit mythology, a mysterious man visits a woman nightly, and the woman mixes her lamp soot with her oil and applies it to her nipples to reveal the man's identity. The next day, seeing his brother's lips black, his sister leaves the village in shame, and his brother follows. The younger sister became the sun and the older brother became the moon. An eclipse occurs when the older brother catches up with his younger sister. This myth, which talks about the origin of the sun and moon and even the origin of the solar eclipse, presents the issue of incest as a key motive for the origin of the sun and moon. Although there are slight variations, the Manchurian myth is the same: the chasing brother's mirror becomes the moon and the running sister's lantern becomes the sun.

In this mythological context, it is highly likely that the brother and sister in Brother and Sister Became the Sun and Moon have a similar relationship. However, the being chasing is not the older brother, but the tiger. The being being chased is not a sister, but a brother and sister, so there is a big difference. However, the tiger may be the animal that replaced the older brother in the process of myth becoming folktale, in other words, the process of erasing the motif of incest. In the myth of brother and sister chasing and being chased, 'the mother who left the house to work' does not appear. Even in the mythology of the Ainu people pursued by wolves and the Jingpo people pursued by leopards, there is no mother. The existence of a mother being eaten by a tiger is one of the characteristics of Korean folktales. Therefore, it is judged that at the depth of Brother and Sister Who Became the Sun and Moon, there is a myth of the origin of the sun and moon in which the older brother chases the sister, and on top of that, the motif of a tiger representing the older brother and a tiger devouring the mother is overlaid.

See also 
 Sun and Moon (Disambiguation page for similar topics)
 Incest taboo

References

External links 

 해와 달이 된 오누이 (경기문화재단) (in Korean)
 Website of Zong In Sob

Korean fairy tales